Wissper is a CGI children's animated television series produced by Made 4 Entertainment (m4e), Telegael and Bastei Media. The first episode premiered in 2014. It is broadcast on UK TV channel Channel 5 on their Milkshake! block.

Characters
Wissper A 7-year-old girl, born with the magical ability to whisper to animals. She has a loving connection to all creatures. By using the magic word "Sssshhh!..." she can transport herself to anywhere if there is an animal in trouble. Wissper is sweet natured, except when animals are behaving badly.
Peggy Peggy is a baby penguin, loveable, cute and mischievous. A great swimmer, erratic waddler and Wissper's best friend Peggy often accompanies Wissper on her amazing adventures.
Kev the Crocodile Kev is an energetic, confident croc with a surfer-dude attitude. Above all he's enthusiastic - he'd love to be a top surfer, but he never quite hits the crest of a wave.
Dan the Pan Panda Dan is laid back, slow, gentle and Zen-like. Dan can be shy in a crowd and is quite content with his own company. When he talks, it appears not to make much sense, since everything he says seems to come from a fortune cookie. Dan loves to chew on bamboo.
Stripes the Tiger She is a feisty, sophisticated lady; powerful and happy in her own fur. Stripes is a well spoken mother figure to Wissper when in the animal worlds. She is fierce when she wants to be, but also inclined to want her tummy rubbed!
Herbert the Horse An honest, strong and hardworking chap who is at his happiest when working up a sweat in the fields or pulling heavy logs up a grassy slope. He likes nothing better than to have Wissper riding on his back. He has the hairiest feet you have ever seen.
Gertie and Otis Gertie the Giraffe  is tall, gangly, nervous, jittery and easily frightened. Otis the Oxpecker Bird is Gertie‘s laid back, musical  companion. Together best friends, Gertie and Otis  are the perfect combination to help  when height is needed.
Monty Monty the Meerkat is very lively – chattering, playing and racing. He‘s quick, alert, suspicious, funny and unpredictable. Monty has a huge family and loves acrobatics.
Ellington An elephant who is clumsy, and loves waking up all. And he love acrobatics.
Ralph Ralph aka Ralphie is a brother of wissper he was playing and singing. He dislikes being called Ralphie and prefers to be called Ralph.
Oscar Oscar the orangutan.
Sam Sam the seal.
Samson Samson the lion.
Ritchie Ritchie the ostrich.
Sonia Sonia the slow loris.
Mavis Mavis the pig.

Episodes
Season 1
 Pingwing Penguin
 Clumsy Elephant
 Polar Brrr
 Meerkat Muddle
 Mice View
 Tiger Teeth Trouble
 Orangutangle
 Step On It Seal
 Jumping Joey
 Monkey Mischief
 Strong as a Horse
 Panda Pal
 Calm Down Croc!
 Up With the Birds
 Pig in a Puddle
 Thirsty Giraffe
 Bear Cub Bedtime
 Roar, Lion, Roar!
 Pitch Perfect Panda
 Ostrich Away
 Whale Song Sing-a-long
 The Slow Slow Loris
 Hipp-No!
 Lostrich
 Meerkat Patro
 Oh No Polar Bear!
 Eager Beavers
 Camel Hump
 Flamingo Flamenco
 Paddling Pigs
 Arctic Foxed
 Handsome Horse
 Penguin Playtime
 Mini Mice Mystery
 Sssh Penguin Sssh
 Polar Bear Scare
 Koala Tag
 Sing Elephant Sing
 Meerkat Mystery
 Jump, Horse, Jump
 Bear in the Middle
 Orangutidy
 Gourmet Hippo
 A Penguin Party
 Horse in a Hole
 Pushy Penguins
 Croc Up a Tree
 Meerkat Itch!
 Polar Bears On Ice
 Pretty As A Pig
  A Penguin Pal Problem
 Orangutan's Bad Hair Day
Season 2

References

External links 
 
 Wissper - Homepage

2015 British television series debuts
2010s British animated television series
2010s British children's television series
British children's animated adventure television series
British children's animated comedy television series
British children's animated fantasy television series
British preschool education television series
English-language television shows
Channel 5 (British TV channel) original programming
Animated television series about children
Animated television series about penguins
Animated television series about reptiles and amphibians
Television series about pandas
Television series about tigers
Animated television series about horses
Fictional giraffes
Animated television series about birds
Animated television series about elephants
Animated preschool education television series
2010s preschool education television series